= Shenzhen Fashion Week =

Semi-annually fashion event in Shenzhen, China

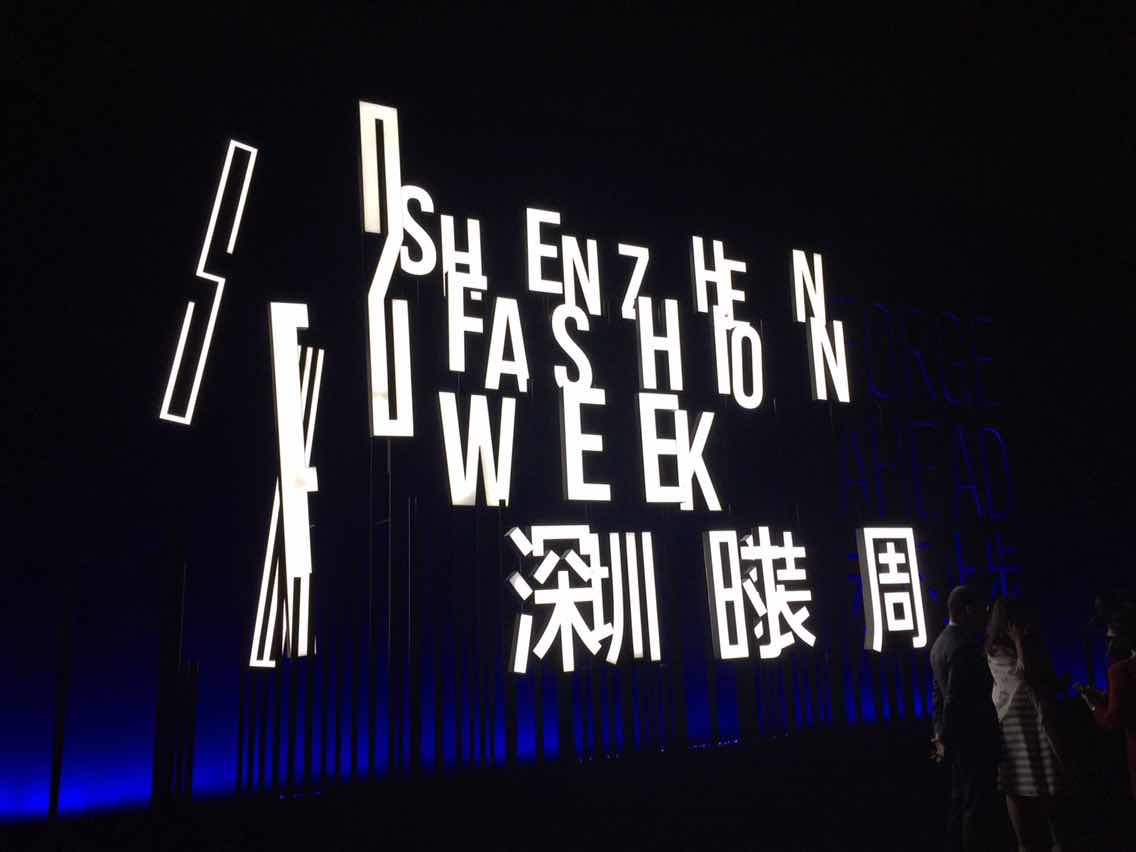
Shenzhen Fashion Week 2015

Shenzhen Fashion Week (Chinese: 深圳时装周) is a series of designer presentations held semi-annually in Shenzhen, China, with spring and autumn events held each year. SFW is a fashion event hosted by the People's Government of Shenzhen, organized by the Bureau of Industry and Information Technology Shenzhen Municipality, and undertaken by the Shenzhen Garment Industry Association. It was first held in 2015.
